is one of the oldest and largest construction companies in Japan.  Founded in 1840, the company has its headquarters in Motoakasaka, Minato, Tokyo. The company is known for its DIB-200 proposal. The company stock is traded on four leading Japanese stock exchanges and is a constituent of the Nikkei 225 stock index.

Kajima's services include design, engineering, construction, and real estate development. Kajima builds high-rise structures, railways, power plants, dams, and bridges. Its subsidiaries are located throughout Asia, Oceania, Europe, and North America. A downturn in the construction industry during the latter half of the 1990s prompted Kajima to expand its operations to the environmental sector, specifically waste treatment, water treatment, soil rehabilitation, and environmental consulting.

History

 1840 - Iwakichi Kajima, the founder of the present-day company begins carpentry business in Edo (present day Tokyo)
 1860 - Kajima pioneers first western-style building in Yokohama (Ei-Ichiban Kan)
 1880 - Establishes Kajima Gumi
 1899 - Railway construction projects begin in Korea and Taiwan
 1923 - Great Kantō earthquake -  Kajima participates in the reconstruction work
 1930 - Incorporation of the company (issues stock, capitalized at 3 million yen)
 1945 - Postwar reconstruction begins with Kajima's support
 1949 - Founds Kajima Technical Research Institute (the first construction research facility in Japan)
 1950 - Pioneers first joint venture with Morrison-Knudsen
 1957 - Completes Japan's first nuclear reactor (Japan Atomic Energy Research Institute's Tōkai JRR-1 reactor)
 1959 - Construction of the Tokaido Shinkansen begins
 1961 - The company is listed on Tokyo and Osaka Stock Exchange
 1963 - Becomes world no. 1 in construction (total contract value)
Constructs facilities for 1964 Tokyo Olympic Games
 1964 - Establishment of Kajima International Incorporated (KII) in Los Angeles, California, U.S.
 1968 - Japan's first high-rise building, the Kasumigaseki Building, is completed
 1975 - Founds PT. Waskita Kajima, as a joint venture with Waskita Karya
 1987 - Establishment of  Kajima Europe B.V. (KE) in the Netherlands
 1988 - Establishment of  Kajima Overseas Asia Pte Ltd. (KOA) in Singapore
The Seikan Tunnel, the world's longest tunnel, is completed
 1994 - Construction of Kansai International Airport is finalized
 1998 - Akashi Kaikyo Bridge is completed
Bought all of Waskita Karya's share on Waskita Kajima, resulting Kajima as majority shareholder of the company. The company then renamed to Kajima Indonesia 
 2001 - The Suez Canal Bridge is completed
 2002 - Hawaiian Dredging is acquired from Dillingham Construction.
 2003 - Establishment of  Kajima (Shanghai) Construction Co., Ltd.
 2010 - Construction of Resorts World Sentosa in Singapore completed
 2011 - The company completed the construction of the Dubai Metro (phase 1 and 2)

Demolition technology
The Kajima Corporation developed a building demolition technique that involves using hydraulic jacks to demolish a building one floor at a time. This method is safer, and allows for a more efficient recycling process. In the Spring of 2008, the Kajima Corporation used this technique to demolish a 17-story and 20-story building, recycling 99% of the steel and concrete and 92% of the interior materials in the process.

Film backing
The Kasumigaseki Building, built by Kajima, is the main subject of the film Chōkōsō no Akebono, which was backed by Kajima.

Scandal 
On March 2, 2018, the head of a division at Kajima was arrested by an investigative team from the Tokyo District Public Prosecutors Office on suspicion of having violated the Act on Prohibition of Private Monopolization and Maintenance of Fair Trade in connection with bidding for the Chūō Shinkansen maglev line. On March 23, the Fair Trade Commission issued a criminal indictment against both the head of the division and Kajima Corporation.

See also 
 List of high rise buildings in Leipzig

Footnotes

External links

Official site  
English site 

Construction and civil engineering companies based in Tokyo
Companies listed on the Tokyo Stock Exchange
Companies listed on the Osaka Exchange
Companies listed on the Nagoya Stock Exchange
Japanese brands
Japanese companies established in 1840
Construction and civil engineering companies established in 1840